Butautai Manor is a former residential manor in Butautai, Biržai District Municipality.

References

Manor houses in Lithuania